Greaves Cotton Ltd. is an Indian engineering company that manufactures engines and heavy equipment. It is traded on the National Stock Exchange of India (NSE) and the Bombay Stock Exchange (BSE).

History 
The company was founded in 1859 by James Greaves and George Cotton. It was incorporated in 1922 as a private limited company. Greaves Cotton was purchased by Lala Karam Chand Thapar of the Thapar Group in 1947. It was converted into a public limited company in 1950.

Products

The company produces diesel, petrol, kerosene, gasoline engines, diesel pump sets, gensets and farm equipment.

Greaves Cotton completely owns the Coimbatore-based electric vehicle manufacturer, Ampere Electric Vehicles. The acquisition marked the entry in the ever-booming EV industry.

References

External links
Business profile at indiacom.com
Company history at economictimes.com

Manufacturing companies based in Mumbai
Engineering companies of India
Indian companies established in 1859
1859 establishments in British India
Companies listed on the National Stock Exchange of India
Companies listed on the Bombay Stock Exchange
Indian companies established in 1922